Malaya is a 1949 American war film set in colonial Malaya during World War II directed by Richard Thorpe and starring Spencer Tracy, James Stewart and  Valentina Cortese. The supporting cast features Sydney Greenstreet, John Hodiak, and Lionel Barrymore, with Richard Loo and Gilbert Roland. It was produced by Metro-Goldwyn-Mayer.

Plot
In January 1942, one month after the United States entered World War II, reporter John Royer (James Stewart) returns to the United States. He goes to see his friend, newspaper publisher John Manchester (Lionel Barrymore), about a scheme to smuggle desperately needed rubber out of Japanese-occupied Malaya. Manchester, though he has been selected by the government to deal with the rubber shortage, does not seem interested. However, later, government agent Kellar  (John Hodiak) takes Royer to a meeting with Manchester and others. Royer is granted approval to put the smuggling plan into action.

Royer needs the help of his old friend, the smuggler Carnaghan (Spencer Tracy). He succeeds in getting Carnaghan released from Alcatraz – where the Royer's exposé had landed him – to help. They slip into Malaya and contact Carnaghan's associate, the Dutchman (Sidney Greenstreet), who recruits a gang for them from customers in his saloon, including Romano (Gilbert Roland). Carnaghan also renews his acquaintance with the saloon's singer, Luana from Italy (Valentina Cortese).

Using money and intimidation, they succeed in purchasing all the available rubber, but eventually the Japanese commander, Colonel Tomura (Richard Loo), gets wind of the scheme. On the last trip to transport the remaining rubber - belonging to German plantation owner Bruno Gerber (Roland Winters) - to a waiting freighter, Carnaghan smells an ambush. He forces Gerber to confess that he tipped off Tomura. Royer decides to try going around the ambush, but Carnaghan refuses to go with him. Royer is killed by the waiting soldiers.

Tomura hints to the Dutchman that he would be willing to look the other way and let the rubber go in return for gold. Despite the Dutchman's certainty that Tomura is lying, the cynical Carnaghan takes him up on his offer. The Dutchman is right; Carnaghan is captured by Tomura. He takes Tomura to where the freighter lies hidden, but when a Japanese warship arrives, it is met by two PT boats, which proceed to sink it with torpedoes. Carnaghan first shoots the soldiers guarding him, then Tomura, but is himself wounded in the exchange of gunfire.

When Malaya is liberated by the Allies, Kellar - hoping to present Carnaghan with a medal - tracks the smuggler to an island where he has settled down with Luana. Carnaghan refuses the honor, and tells Kellar to give the medal to the Dutchman.

Cast
Spencer Tracy as Carnaghan
James Stewart as John Royer
Valentina Cortese as Luana, bar singer and Carnaghan's former girlfriend
Sydney Greenstreet as The Dutchman
John Hodiak as Kellar
Lionel Barrymore as John Manchester
Richard Loo as Colonel Tomura
Gilbert Roland as Romano
Roland Winters as Bruno Gerber, a German plantation owner

Cast notes
This was Greenstreet's last picture.  He was borrowed from Warner Bros. for the film.
Valentina Cortese was borrowed from 20th Century Fox.
DeForest Kelley appears as Lt. Glenson.

Production
The film was based on Manchester Boddy's plan to get rubber out of Japanese-held Malaya after a fire destroyed a large part of the US government's supply of raw rubber at the Firestone Tire & Rubber Company's plant in Fall River, Massachusetts. The character John Manchester, portrayed by Lionel Barrymore, was based on Boddy.

The film was originally developed by Dore Schary for RKO under the title Operation Malaya. Howard Hughes rejected both Operation Malaya and Battleground.  When Schary left RKO to go to Metro-Goldwyn-Mayer, he bought the property from MGM. Principal photography took place from mid-February to March 24, 1949. The film's release was delayed due to hesitation about making a film about World War II.

This film was the first occasion on which James Stewart worked with Spencer Tracy since his screen debut in Murder Man (1935) in which he had a minor role with sixth billing.

Reception
The New York Times critic Bosley Crowther called the film "a rousing, old-fashioned thriller about bold men with wily minds and crushing fists. Scenarist Frank Fenton crowded plenty of action into the script and Richard Thorpe's direction keeps the screen pulsing with excitement".

According to MGM records, the film earned $1,959,000 in the U.S. and Canada and $1,128,000 in other markets, resulting in a profit of $691,000.

References

External links 
 
 
 
 

1949 films
Films set in Malaysia
American black-and-white films
Metro-Goldwyn-Mayer films
Pacific War films
Films directed by Richard Thorpe
Films scored by Bronisław Kaper
Films set in 1942
American adventure drama films
1940s adventure drama films
1949 drama films
1940s American films